Jesse Sene-Lefao (born 8 December 1989) is a Samoa international rugby league footballer who plays as a  or  forward for the Sheffield Eagles in the RFL Championship.

Sene-Lefao has previously played for the Manly-Warringah Sea Eagles and the Cronulla-Sutherland Sharks in the NRL, plus Castleford Tigers (Heritage № 974) in the Super League.

Background
Sene-Lefao was born in Wellington, New Zealand.

Early years
Sene-Lefao is nephew of West Tigers centre Tim Simona, and cousin of North Queensland Cowboys centre Matthew Wright. Sene-Lefao is of Samoan descent.

Sene-Lefao played his junior football for the Penrith Brothers before being signed by the Penrith Panthers. Sene-Lefao played for the Panthers' NYC team in 2008 and 2009, scoring 15 tries in 38 games.

Playing career

2013
In 2013, Sene-Lefao joined the Manly-Warringah Sea Eagles. He made his NRL debut in the opening round of the season against the Brisbane Broncos at Suncorp Stadium, playing off the interchange bench in Manly-Warringah's 22–14 win. Sene-Lefao played his 2nd and last match for the year in round 8. 

Sene-Lefao spent most of the year playing for the team's New South Wales Cup team.

2014
Sene-Lefao was selected in Manly's inaugural 2014 NRL Auckland Nines squad. He made his international debut in May for Samoa in the test against Fiji at Penrith Stadium. Sene-Lefao played off the interchange bench in Samoa's 32–16 win. Soon after, Sene-Lefao re-signed with the Manly-Warringah club on a two-year contract.

In round 13 against the Canterbury-Bankstown Bulldogs at Brookvale Oval, Sene-Lefao scored his first NRL career try in Manly's 32–10 win. It was the sole try he scored from 25 matches in 2014. At the end of the season, Sene-Lefao was a late selection for Samoa in the Four Nations after Suaia Matagi was selected in the New Zealand national rugby league team squad.

2015
Sene-Lefao was again part of the Manly Auckland Nines squad in 2015. He scored two tries from his 11 matches in 2015. On 9 October, Sene-Lefao signed a two/year contract with the Cronulla-Sutherland Sharks, starting from 2016 after he was released from his final year of his contract with Manly.

2016
Sene-Lefao played 6 games for the Cronulla-Sutherland Sharks in 2016. He was a vital squad member for Cronulla-Sutherland in 2016, filling in for captain Paul Gallen during the semis, and the injured Sam Tagataese towards the end of the season. Although he did not play in Cronulla's 2016 drought breaking premiership win.

On 21 October 2016, Sene-Lefao signed a two-year contract with Castleford Tigers.

2017
Sene-Lefao played in the 2017 Super League Grand Final defeat by the Leeds Rhinos at Old Trafford.

2018
In the 2018 Super League season, he made 17 appearances for Castleford as the club finished third on the table but failed to reach the grand final.

2019
Sene-Lefao played 24 games for Castleford as they finished the Super League XXIV season in 5th place on the table.  Castleford reached the second week of the 2019 Super League finals series where they were defeated by Salford 22-0 in the elimination semi-final.

2020
Sene-Lefao made nine appearances for Castleford in the 2020 Super League season.  The club finished a disappointing ninth on the table, their lowest finish since 2013.

2021
On 17 July 2021, Sene-Lefao played for Castleford in their 2021 Challenge Cup Final loss against St. Helens.

2022
On 20 December 2021, it was reported that he had signed for Featherstone Rovers in the RFL Championship
On 28 May, he played for Featherstone in their 2022 RFL 1895 Cup final loss against Leigh.

References

External links

Castleford Tigers profile
NRL profile
Cronulla-Sutherland Sharks profile 
SL profile

1989 births
Living people
Castleford Tigers players
Cronulla-Sutherland Sharks players
Featherstone Rovers players
Manly Warringah Sea Eagles players
New Zealand sportspeople of Samoan descent
New Zealand people of Tokelauan descent
New Zealand people of Tuvaluan descent
New Zealand expatriate sportspeople in England
New Zealand rugby league players
Rugby league players from Wellington City
Rugby league props
Rugby league second-rows
Samoa national rugby league team players
Samoan sportspeople
Samoan expatriate sportspeople in England
Sheffield Eagles players
Windsor Wolves players